Charlie Greene may refer to:

 Charlie Greene (baseball) (born 1971), former Major League Baseball backup catcher
 Charlie Greene (soccer) (born 1959), retired American soccer player
 Charlie Greene (athlete) (born 1945), American former track and field sprinter

See also
 Charles Greene (disambiguation)
 Charlie Green (disambiguation)